Clément Gignac (born May 7, 1955) is a Canadian politician who represented the riding of Marguerite-Bourgeoys in the National Assembly of Quebec from 2009 to 2012. A member of the Quebec Liberal Party, he was elected in a by-election on June 22, 2009, following the resignation of Monique Jérôme-Forget.

On the following day, Gignac was named by Jean Charest as the new Minister of Economic Development, Innovation and Export Trade — a role which was previously held by Raymond Bachand, who was also the Finance Minister.

Prior to his election to the Assembly, Gignac was (for a brief period of time) a senior advisor to the deputy minister of Finance in Ottawa.

Prior to this appointment, Gignac was senior vice-president, chief economist and strategist of National Bank Financial and in this role has ranked constantly over the last decade amongst the top strategists and economists in the country.

On July 29, 2021, the Governor General Mary Simon, under recommendation of Prime Minister Justin Trudeau, appointed Gignac as a Québec member of the Senate of Canada.

Biographical Notes 
Gignac holds both a Bachelor's degree and Master's degree in economics from Université Laval. Before entering politics, Gignac served as special advisor to the federal deputy minister of finance in 2009. In this position, he represented Canada on a G20 task force. During the previous 20 years, Gignac acted as economic consultant and strategist for several prominent financial institutions, notably National Bank Financial, as Vice-President and Chief Economist from 2000 to 2008. For five consecutive years, his group ranked among the top three Canadian economist teams in the annual Brendan Wood International survey of some 100 institutional clients.

As minister of Economic Development, he introduced the government's strategy in research and innovation and participated in the creation of its strategy on entrepreneurship.

Since December 2012, Clément Gignac has held the position of Senior Vice-President and Chief Economist at Industrial Alliance. As well as serving as spokesman on economic matters, he chairs the asset allocation committee and manages diversified funds with assets exceeding $3 billion.

In 2012, he was asked by the prestigious World Economic Forum to sit as chair on the Global Agenda Council on Competitiveness, and in May 2015, he received the Gloire de l'Escolle medal for exceptional merit from Université Laval.

On July 29, 2021 it was announced that Clément Gignac was appointed to the Canadian senate by Prime Minister Justin Trudeau, to sit as an independent senator.

Electoral record

See also
Université Laval

References

External links
 
 

1955 births
Living people
Members of the Executive Council of Quebec
People from Capitale-Nationale
Quebec Liberal Party MNAs
21st-century Canadian politicians
Canadian senators from Quebec
Independent Canadian senators